Olia Berger (born June 30, 1980) is a female judoka from Canada. Her father is judoka Mark Berger, who was an Olympic medalist for Canada in 1984.

Berger, who is Jewish, earned a bronze medal for Canada in judo in the O72 at the 1997 Maccabiah Games in Tel Aviv, Israel. In 1999, she won the Pan American Under-17 Championship in judo in the O70.

She won the bronze medal in the women's heavyweight division (+ 78 kg) at the 2003 Pan American Games in Santo Domingo, Dominican Republic, alongside Ecuador's Carmen Chalá. She came in fifth at the Judo World Cup Prague in 2005. In 2000, 2001, 2002, 2004, 2007, and 2008, she won the Canadian Championships in the O78.

See also
Judo in Canada

References

  

1983 births
Living people
Canadian female judoka
Competitors at the 1997 Maccabiah Games
Jewish martial artists
Jewish Canadian sportspeople
Maccabiah Games medalists in judo
Maccabiah Games bronze medalists for Canada
Judoka at the 2003 Pan American Games
Pan American Games bronze medalists for Canada
Pan American Games medalists in judo
Medalists at the 2003 Pan American Games
20th-century Canadian women
21st-century Canadian women